Weddigen was a wolf pack of German U-boats that operated during the battle of the Atlantic in World War II.

Service history
Weddigen was formed in November 1943 off the coast of Portugal, to intercept convoys sailing to and from Gibraltar, Mediterranean and South Atlantic. It was composed of U-boats from the disbanded patrol group Schill, with reinforcements from the North Atlantic and from bases in occupied France.

Weddigen originally numbered seventeen U-boats, though two had been destroyed in recent actions, and two others had to withdraw with damage. On 22 November the thirteen U-boats remaining formed a patrol line west of Portugal to await warning of an Allied convoy.

On 23 November one of the Weddigen boats, fell in with the frigate , of 4th Escort Group accompanying KMS 30 and was destroyed.

On 27 November the Weddigen boats intercepted convoy SL 140/MKS 31, and attacked it over the next five days, though without success. On 29 November  was destroyed by aircraft from the carrier , while on 28th  and  had been attacked and damaged, also by aircraft from Bogue.

On 7 December Weddigen was disbanded, a number of U-boats returning to base, while others formed a cadre of a new patrol group, code-named Borkum.

U-boats involved

 sunk 29 November 1943

 

 sunk 28 November 1943

 sunk 25 November 1943

 sunk 23 November 1943

The name
Weddigen was named for Otto Weddigen, German World War I U-boat ace.

Notes

References
 Paul Kemp  : U-Boats Destroyed  ( 1997) . 
 Jak P M Showell U-Boat Warfare: The Evolution of the Wolf-Pack  (2002)

External links

Wolfpacks of 1943
1943 establishments in Germany